Craig Baxter was an American diplomat, academic, and historian of South Asian history. He was the founder of the American Institute of Bangladesh Studies.

Early life 
Baxter graduated from the Wharton School of the University of Pennsylvania in 1951. He served in the United States Army for two years and then did his masters from the University of Pennsylvania. He studied Hindi and Urdu languages at the Foreign Service Institute. He was appointed as political officer at the United States Embassy in Delhi. He did his PhD at the University of Pennsylvania on Bharatiya Jana Sangh, right-wing Hindu nationalist party in India and the precursor of the present-day Bharatiya Janata Party.

Career 
Baxter headed the Bangladesh Desk at the US State Department during the Bangladesh Liberation War. He was the only US diplomat authorized to communicate with Bengali diplomats during the war. In the late 1970s he served as the Deputy Chief of the United States Mission to Bangladesh. From 1978 to 1980, he was the Officer-in-Charge for International Scientific Relations for the Near East, South Asia, and Africa.

In the mid 1980s Baxter joined Juniata College in Huntingdon, Pennsylvania as a professor of political science and went on to become the chair of political science at the college. He founded the American Institute of Bangladesh Studies in 1989.

Baxter wrote 13 books on the geopolitics of South Asia. He edited and annotated the book, Diaries of Field Marshal Mohammad Ayub Khan, 1966-1972.

Death 
Baxter died on 7 February 2008. The Dr. Craig Baxter Memorial Fund was established in 2008 through a donation by his estate. It provides financial support to South Asian studies.

References 

2008 deaths
Wharton School of the University of Pennsylvania alumni
University of Pennsylvania School of Arts and Sciences alumni
American diplomats
Historians of South Asia
Juniata College faculty